Battle of the Strait of Hormuz or battle off Hormuz may refer to:

Portuguese conquest of Ormuz (1507)
Ottoman campaign against Hormuz (1552–1554)
Battle of the Strait of Hormuz (1553)
Anglo-Persian capture of Ormuz (1622)
Battle off Hormuz (1625)

See also
Piracy in the Strait of Hormuz